The 2001 FIA GT Estoril 500 km was the eleventh and final round the 2001 FIA GT Championship season.  It took place at the Autódromo do Estoril, Portugal, on October 21, 2001.

Official results
Class winners in bold.  Cars failing to complete 70% of winner's distance marked as Not Classified (NC).

Statistics
 Pole position – #77 RWS Motorsport† – 1:45.694
 Fastest lap – #1 Lister Storm Racing – 1:40.186
 Average speed – 124.620 km/h

† – The Superpole shoot-out started under dry conditions, with the RWS Motorsport Porsche able to set a time before rain began to fall.  This allowed an N-GT class car to take pole position while the other competitors were slowed.

References

 
 

E
FIA GT